Mari Devon (born October 10, 1959) is a retired American voice actress, best known as the voice of Togemon from Digimon Adventure, Renamon from Digimon Tamers, Tammy Nobi from Doraemon 2005, Haruka Urashima from the Love Hina series, Yayoi Matsunaga from Nightwalker, Maria Tachibana from Sakura Wars, and Tokimi from Tenchi Muyo Ryo Oki. Devon has reprised her role as Togemon in Digimon Adventure Tri, and Tammy in Stand by Me Doraemon.

Filmography

Animation
 Batman: The Animated Series – Summer Gleason
 Batman Beyond – Miss Winston (Ep. 3)
 Freakazoid! — Tammy
 The Zeta Project – Computer (Ep. 18)
 Tom & Jerry Kids – Additional Voices
 The Loud House — Additional Voices

Anime
 8 Man After – Sachiko Yokogawa
 A Little Snow Fairy Sugar – Anne, Ginger, Greta's Mother
 The Adventures of Mini-Goddess – Marller
 Ah My Buddha – Jotoku Kawahara
 Apocalypse Zero – Ponta
 Aquarian Age – The Movie – Stella Blavatsky
 Babel II – Juju
 Battle Athletes – Dorm Chief
 Battle B-Daman – B-DaMage
 The Big O – Vice-President (Ep. 17)
 Blue Exorcist – Shimei's Mother (Ep. 4)
 Cyborg 009 – Daphne, Rosa (Ep. 13)
 Detatoko Princess – Okuchuuru
 Digimon: Digital Monsters – Togemon (Adventure, Adventure 02 and Adventure tri.), Izzy's mom (Adventure 01 and 02), Arukenimon (Adventure 02), Viximon/Renamon/Kyubimon/Taomon/Sakuyamon (Share With Melissa Fahn)(Tamers), Dokugumon (Adventure 01)
 Dog of Flanders – Mrs. Jestas
 Doraemon – Tammy (Tamako Nobi)
 Eiken – Teacher, Nigo
 El Hazard: The Wanderers – Demon God Ifurita
 eX-Driver – Rei Kazuma
 Fafner – Yoko Hazuma
 Fight! Iczer-One – Iczer-Two
 Flint the Time Detective – Jillian Gray
 Fushigi Yûgi – Kai-ka's Mother
 Gad Guard – Hilda F. Harmony, Linda
 Gate Keepers – Mrs. Shinamura
 Gate Keepers 21 – Saemi Ikeda
 Gankutsuou: The Count of Monte Cristo – Victoria
 Ghost in the Shell: Stand Alone Complex – Seymour
 Gurren Lagann – Cybela
 Howl's Moving Castle – Honey
 Hunter × Hunter 2011 series – Woman at Agency (Ep. 30)
 Kanokon - Tamamo
 Kyo Kara Maoh! – Sharon
 Love Hina/OVA (Again) – Haruka Urashima
 Magic Knight Rayearth – Presea, Sierra
 Mars Daybreak – Anna Grace
 Mirage of Blaze – Yuiko
 Mouse – Scientist, Woof's boss, Rin Nyan
 Mobile Suit Gundam – The Movie Trilogy – Kamaria Ray
 Mobile Suit Gundam 0083: Stardust Memory – Mora Bascht
 Mobile Suit Gundam F91 – Leahlee Edaberry
 Moldiver – Agent Brooke
 Naruto – Katsuyu
 Nura: Rise of the Yokai Clan- Kagibiri Onna
 Nightwalker – Kasumi, Shinji, Yayoi Matsunaga
 Noozles – Kelly Brown, Olivia
 Paradise Kiss – Isabella
 Petite Cossette – Zenshinni of Shakado
 Rave Master – Lasage
 Rurouni Kenshin – Takani Megumi
 Saiyuki Reload – Dr. Huang
 Sakura Wars: The Movie – Maria Tachibana
 Scrapped Princess – Queen Elmyr
 Shinzo –  Queen Bee-Ing, Pixie Kadrian
 Space Adventure Cobra – Catherine
 Stellvia – Najima Gabourg
 Teknoman – Maggie
 Tenchi Muyo! – Tokimi; Z's Mother (OVA 3)
 Twelve Kingdoms – Kaiko; Ritsuko Nakajima
 Vandread – Gascogne/Gasco Rheingau
 Windaria – Marie

Movies
 A Turtle's Tale 2: Sammy's Escape from Paradise - American Woman
 Batman & Mr. Freeze: SubZero - Summer Gleeson
 Digimon Tamers: Battle of Adventurers - Renamon, Kyubimon, Taomon
 Digimon Tamers: Runaway Locomon - Renamon, Sakuyamon
 Digimon Adventure tri. – Togemon
 Howl's Moving Castle - Honey
 Mobile Suit Gundam F91 - Leahlee Edaberry, Leah Mariba
 Sakura Wars: The Movie - Maria Tachibana
 Space Adventure Cobra: The Movie - Catherine Flower
 Stand By Me Doraemon - Tammy (Tamako Nobi)

Video games
 Digimon Rumble Arena - Renamon, Sakuyamon
 The Adventures of Batman & Robin Activity Center (1996) - Summer Gleeson
 Carmen Sandiego Word Detective – Carmen Sandiego
 Carmen Sandiego: Math Detective – Carmen Sandiego
 View-Master Batman Animated VR – Summer Gleeson

Other
Adventures in Voice Acting

References

External links
 
 

1959 births
Living people
Place of birth missing (living people)
American voice actresses
American video game actresses
Actresses from Los Angeles
20th-century American actresses
21st-century American actresses